Nanobagrus stellatus is a species of bagrid catfish endemic to Indonesia where it is found in the Batang Hari basin of Sumatra.  It grows to a length of 3.4 cm and is colored brown with three rows of cream-colored spots that are located above, along and below the lateral line.

References 

Bagridae
Fish of Asia
Freshwater fish of Indonesia
Fish described in 2000